Kårstø Power Station is an unused natural gas-fired thermal power plant located at the Kårstø industrial site in the southwestern part of the municipality of Tysvær in Rogaland county, Norway. The power plant is owned and operated by the Naturkraft company, which is itself equally owned by Statkraft and Statoil. The plant opened on 2 November 2007 and was used intermittently for a few years before being mothballed on 3 October 2014. Approval for decommissioning was granted by the Norwegian government in 2016. Dismantling started in September 2017.

Capacity
The power station consumes about 0.6 billion normal cubic meter natural gas per year, or 0.5% of Norwegian natural gas exports. Emissions are 1.2 million tonnes of carbon dioxide and 5 parts per million of nitrogen oxide. The entire output of the station is in electricity, since there is no need for district heating in the uninhabited area.

Decommissioning
The power station has been subject to massive controversy in Norway. Kårstø is the first commercial fossil fuel power station in Norway and environmentalists have argued that it is unnecessary to open another power station as long as Norway has the highest use of electricity per capita in the world.

Also long periods of low efficiency due to gas prices as well as the high cost of upgrading the equipment to lower greenhouse gas emissions led to several periods of temporary closures of the plant.  These periods of closures increased the corporate losses of about  annually for the plant.  On 3 October 2014, Naturkraft AS decided to indefinitely suspend production at the power station due to the market situation. The facility continues to be minimally maintained so that at some point in the future it could resume power production. Decommissioning would have no effect on national power supply.
Resume of power production is no longer possible, the dismantling and demolition of the plant started in September 2017.

See also

Energy in Norway

References

Natural gas-fired power stations in Norway
Energy infrastructure completed in 2007
Statkraft
Equinor
Tysvær